East Main Street Historic District is a national historic district located at Forest City, Rutherford County, North Carolina.  It encompasses 115 contributing buildings and 3 contributing structures in a predominantly residential section of Forest City.  The district developed after 1914, and includes notable examples of Colonial Revival and Bungalow / American Craftsman style architecture. Located in the district is the separately listed T. Max Watson House.  Other notable buildings include the Brown-Griffith House (1923), Dr. W. C. Bostic Jr. House (1926), John W. and Bertha M. Dalton House (1939), J. H. Thomas House (1922), and the Marley Sigmon House (1962).

It was added to the National Register of Historic Places in 2005.

Gallery

References

Forest City, North Carolina
Historic districts on the National Register of Historic Places in North Carolina
Colonial Revival architecture in North Carolina
Buildings and structures in Rutherford County, North Carolina
National Register of Historic Places in Rutherford County, North Carolina